Cyclidia substigmaria is a moth of the family Drepanidae described by Jacob Hübner in 1831. It is found in Taiwan, China, India and Japan.

The wingspan is 55–65 mm.

The larvae are gregarious and specialist herbivores on Alangium species.

Subspecies
Cyclidia substigmaria substigmaria (Taiwan, China and Vietnam)
Cyclidia substigmaria intermedia Prout, 1918 (Tibet)
Cyclidia substigmaria modesta Bryk, 1943 (Myanmar)
Cyclidia substigmaria nigralbata Warren, 1914 (Japan, Korean Peninsula)
Cyclidia substigmaria superstigmaria Prout, 1918 (India, Nepal)

References

Moths described in 1855
Cyclidiinae
Moths of Japan